Lake Terrace or Lake terrace may refer to

 Lake Terrace (skyscraper), a building in Dubai.
 Lake Terrace/Lake Oaks, New Orleans, a neighborhood of New Orleans
 Lake (lacustrine) terrace, the former shoreline of a lake

See also 
 Terrace Lake